United Nations Security Council Resolution 123 was adopted on February 21, 1957 after the conflict over Jammu and Kashmir intensified. The council requested that the President of the Security Council visit the subcontinent and, along with the governments of India and Pakistan, examine any proposals which were likely to contribute to the resolution of the dispute.  The council requested that he report back to them no later than April 15, and the resulting report formed the basis of United Nations Security Council Resolution 126, which was adopted in December of the same year.

The resolution was adopted by ten votes to none; the Soviet Union abstained.

See also
Kashmir conflict
List of United Nations Security Council Resolutions 101 to 200 (1953–1965)

References 
Text of the Resolution at undocs.org

External links
 

 0123
 0123
February 1957 events